Trifolium siskiyouense, the Siskiyou clover, is a clover species endemic to the Klamath Mountains in the western United States.

Distribution
The plant species is native to northwestern California and southwestern Oregon, in the Klamath Mountains. It is reported from only 5 counties: Shasta and Siskiyou Counties in California; and Josephine, Douglas and Jackson Counties in Oregon.

The type specimen was collected in 1904 near Grants Pass in Josephine County, Oregon. Part of its range is protected within the Klamath National Forest.

Description
Trifolium siskiyouenseis a glabrous, perennial herb with thickened roots but no rhizomes. Flowers are white to cream-colored.

References

siskiyouense
Flora of California
Flora of Oregon
Flora of the Klamath Mountains
Natural history of the California Coast Ranges
Natural history of Siskiyou County, California
~
Critically endangered flora of California
Flora without expected TNC conservation status